The National Institute of Banking and Finance (NIBAF) is a subsidiary of the State Bank of Pakistan (SBP) head by the managing director, a board of directors and the governor of State Bank of Pakistan. NIBAF, a non-profit organisation, aims at providing training and development to central and commercial bankers at national as well as international level. One of its important roles is to develop human capital of SBP and its subsidiaries. It has trained 140 participants from friendly countries through 22 weeks of training during the financial year 2006-07.

History 
The National Institute of Banking and Finance (NIBAF) was set up on 8 March 1993 as a 'Private Limited Company by Guarantee' and was sponsored by the erstwhile Pakistan Banking Council (PBC) in collaboration with National Bank of Pakistan, Habib Bank Limited, United Bank Limited, Muslim Commercial Bank, The Bank of Punjab and Allied Bank Limited. The core purpose was to encourage the study of theory and practice of banking and all allied subjects. It was established under the Pakistani Companies Ordinance 1984 with a paid up capital of Rs. 250.0 million. The equity was contributed by the nationalized commercial banks and PBC that held 3% of the shares in its name. Consequent upon dissolution of PBC in 1997 State Bank of Pakistan took over the assets and liabilities of PBC and purchased assets of NIBAF. In February 1997, the Training Department of the State Bank was shifted to NIBAF premises at Islamabad. After becoming a subsidiary of SBP, its main focus is to provide trainings to the employees of SBP. NIBAF has its head office in Islamabad.

Mission statement 
"to train, develop and groom human resources of SBP, its subsidiaries and other national, international banks and financial institutions."

Core functions 
Designing and development of training programs for SBP staff at post induction, mid career skills up-gradation and advance level;
Designing training curriculum;
To ensure smooth implementation of SBP training business plan;
Conduct international training programs; and
Design and develop training modules/programs.

Courses offered 
NIBAF offers the following courses:
International courses:
Central banking course, and
Commercial banking course.
Certificate courses:
Islamic banking, and
Micro-finance.
SBP courses:
These are short-term courses offered to the employees of the SBP covering several topics relating to laws and practices of banking, book-keeping and accounting, information technology, management sciences, financial management, economics, etc.

International training programs 
The international training programs for central and commercial banking are conducted at NIBAF under the joint aegis of SBP and Economic Affairs Division, Government of Pakistan. Participants are invited from 105 friendly developing countries of the world. Candidates selected under this program (aka: Pakistan Technical Assistance Program or PTAP) are given the facility of return economy class international air-ticket from the port of embarkation (capital of the country) to Islamabad. Boarding and lodging within NIBAF on single occupancy basis are also provided to the foreign candidates.

Academic facilities at NIBAF, Islamabad 
The academic facilities at NIBAF is ideally suited for conducting residential training programs combined with a peaceful and serene environment of the mountains and greenery of Islamabad that is highly congenial for academic pursuits and surely invigorates the mindset of the trainees.

The main building is centrally air-conditioned and contains facilities such as auditorium, training halls with all audio visual facilities, syndicate and break-away rooms, mock bank branch, IT Lab, a library and a rural finance resource centre.

Residential facilities at NIBAF, Islamabad 
The residential block is centrally air-conditioned where boarding and lodging is provided to the participants with the facilities such as fully furnished rooms, 24 executive suites, common entertainment room, cafeteria, a well-equipped fitness club, badminton and basketball club, 24-hour Internet facility, telephone, etc.

See also 
State Bank of Pakistan
Institute of Bankers Pakistan

Notes

External links 
The Official Website of NIBAF
State Bank of Pakistan

Banking institutes
Banking in Pakistan
Professional associations based in Pakistan
State Bank of Pakistan
Pakistan federal departments and agencies
1993 establishments in Pakistan